Yvonne Charlotte Anne-Marie de Gaulle (née Vendroux; 22 May 1900 – 8 November 1979) was the wife of Charles de Gaulle. The couple had three children: Philippe (b. 1921), Élisabeth (1924–2013), and Anne (1928–1948), who was born with Down syndrome. Yvonne de Gaulle set up a charity, to help children with disabilities.

Yvonne and Charles were married on 6 April 1921. She is known for the quote, "The presidency is temporary—but the family is permanent." She and her husband narrowly escaped an assassination attempt on 22 August 1962, when their Citroën DS was targeted by machine gun fire arranged by Jean Bastien-Thiry at the Petit-Clamart.

Like her husband, Yvonne de Gaulle was a conservative Catholic, and campaigned against prostitution, the sale of pornography in newsstands, and the televised display of nudity and sex, which was echoed in her famous nickname,  (“Auntie Yvonne”). Later, she unsuccessfully tried to persuade de Gaulle to outlaw miniskirts in France.

Yvonne was reputed to be very discreet; as such, despite numerous appearances, she never gave any radio or televised interviews, and the broader public never learned the sound of her voice.

Biography

Origins
Yvonne Vendroux came from a family of Calais industrialists with Burgundian roots.  The family name actually originated in The Netherlands, changed from the Dutch "Van Droeg" when the family emigrated during the era of William of Orange (also known as William III of England). William had decided to flood the fields during the 17th century to push back against the advance of troops from King Louis XIV. Yvonne's ancestor then married a Calasienne during the French Revolution.

Her father, Jacques, was the president of the Council of Administration of Biscuitry, while her mother, Marguerite (née Forest), came from a family in Ardennes, and became the sixth woman in France to obtain a driver's license. She was the granddaughter of Alfred Corneau, industriel de Charleville-Mézières. The Vendroux family spent their summers in the chateau in Notre-Dame de Sept-Fontaines abbey, in the Ardennes.

Her eldest brother, Jacques Vendroux, (born 1897) became deputy and mayor of Calais. Her younger brother, Jean (born 1901) married Madeleine Schallier (1907-2000), fathered seven children, and died in an auto accident in 1956.

Her sister Suzanne Vendroux (February 28 1905 in Calais - 27 December 1980 in Worthing, England) married Jean Rerolle (July 12 1897 in Châteauroux - 23 March 1978, Neuilly-sur-Seine) on 5 March 1934 in Fagnon. They had two children, Jacques-Henri (21 January 1935, 17th arrondissement, Paris) and Marguerite-Marie.

Education
Yvonne's parents provided her with a strict education in keeping with their elevated social status and the nature of the era. 

She learned to read at home and studied with the Dominican Order of Asnières-sur-Seine (later moving to Périgueux), and was encouraged, as many girls were at the time, to become proficient in needlework. Children were encouraged to use the vousvoyer with their elders, and during World War I,  went with their governesses to Canterbury, England, not returning to their parents in France until the end of the year. They were later settled in Wissant, a seaside community in Calais along the English Channel.

Marriage to Charles de Gaulle
Yvonne met Charles de Gaulle in 1920, then a military captain returning from a mission in Poland. It was secretly arranged by the Vendroux family. 

Their first date was to the Grand Palais during the fall exhibition to see the painting The Woman in Blue by Kees van Dongen. At a tea shortly after, Charles spilled his cup on young Yvonne's dress. Nonplussed, she laughed, and they continued courting.

Charles invited Yvonne to a Saint-Cyr military ball at the Hotel des Réservoirs, in Versailles, in support of the institution where he had studied from 1912-1918. Two days later, Yvonne declared to her parents, "It will be him, or no one." 

They were engaged on 11 November, before the end of Captain de Gaulle's leave, and married on 7 April 1921, in the Notre-Dame de Calais church. De Gaulle played on Yvonne's family business when he expressed his joy on the occasion, writing to a friend, "I am marrying the biscuits of Vendroux."

They honeymooned in Northern Italy, and went on to have three children, a boy and two girls:

 Philippe de Gaulle, (born 28 December 1921)	
 Élisabeth de Gaulle, (married in Boissieu) (15 May 1924 - 2 April 2013)
 Anne de Gaulle (1 January 1928 - 6 February 1948) (died of bronchial pneumonia)

War years
In 1934, the family maintained the "Brasserie," property and renamed it "la Boisserie," at Colombey-les-Deux-Églises. 
A passionate horticulturist, Yvonne de Gaulle treated the garden as her domain.

The high-walled surroundings were initially intended to protect their daughter Anne, who was afflicted with Down syndrome, from the indiscretion of the public. When Anne passed away in 1948 the family founded The Anne de-Gaulle Foundation in her memory at the château de Vert-Cœur, at Milon-la-Chapelle, directed by future French president Georges Pompidou. Pompidou would subsequently become a close friend to the de Gaulles.

During World War II, Philippe joined the Free French Naval Forces (FNFL), while Yvonne de Gaulle and her husband went to London. General de Gaulle had initially advised her to go south with the children. She managed to make it to London by way of a Dutch ferry to Brest, then Falmouth. It was the last ship leaving the port.

There they made the acquaintance of Prime Minister Winston Churchill, who provided updates of their daily life until they were able to return home.

Spouse of the President
Yvonne de Gaulle became the unofficial First Lady of France on 21 December 1958 when then-General de Gaulle was elected President of the French Republic. The couple took a Citroën to the President's residence, Elysée Palace. Her couturier was Jacques Heim. She was tenacious, conservative, but could also be warm. 

During her husband's tenure as president from 1959 to 1969, Yvonne de Gaulle led a sterile and measured life. On a typical day, she would enjoy three meals with her husband, reading Le Figaro at breakfast, evening television sessions, and Sunday masses at the palace chapel. She epitomized tradition, moral values, and a deep sense of duty. Her Catholic faith influenced the conservative view of her husband on moral matters; after her arrival at the palace, one of the first things she asked was for a pietà to be supplied to the Musée du Louvre. Later, when her husband invited actress Brigitte Bardot to their residence, she threatened to refuse her on the grounds that she had been divorced. She went on to intervene in favour of the authorization of birth control pills.

The couple welcomed Dwight Eisenhower and the Kennedys during their tenure. In 1961, when the American presidential couple John F. Kennedy and Jackie Kennedy were invited by General de Gaulle, she took the initiative to forge links with the American first lady by taking her to visit the childcare school located on Boulevard Brune in the 14th arrondissement. After the assassination of President Kennedy two years later, Madame de Gaulle invited her to rest and avoid media scrutiny in Paris.

But soon the French family would have their own brush with uncertainty: on 22 August 1962, the de Gaulles were the target an assassination attempt in Clamart, organized by French Air Force Lieutenant-Colonel Jean Bastien-Thiry. As de Gaulle's black Citroën DS sped through Petit-Clamart it was met by a barrage of submachine-gun fire. De Gaulle and his entourage, which included his wife, survived the attempt without any casualties or serious injuries while the attempt's perpetrators were subsequently all arrested and put on trial. Bastien-Thiry was convicted of leading the attempt in February 1963 at Fort d'Ivry, becoming the last person to be executed by firing squad in France.

De Gaulle managed to laugh off the incident without disrespecting police. He was deeply impressed with his wife's stoicism, however, reportedly saying, "You are brave, Yvonne."

During the events of May 68, Yvonne accompanied her husband during his displacement to Baden-Baden. She opposed the "Communist" uprising and protests.

Retirement and death

Upon Charles' resignation from the presidency in 1969, Yvonne accompanied him on a retirement trip to Ireland, famous for the photos of the couple and the aide-de-camp, General François Flohic, taken on the beach.

Madame de Gaulle was widowed in 1970 and entered the retirement home of the sisters of the Immaculate Conception in Paris in 1978. She died at the Val-de-Grâce hospital in Paris at the age of 79 on 8 November 1979. She was the same age as her husband had been, on the eve of the ninth anniversary of his death. 

She was buried at Colombey-les-Deux-Églises alongside her husband and their daughter Anne.

Tributes

 Book Madame de Gaulle (1981), by Marcel Jullian.
 Melun's retirement home is named after Yvonne de Gaulle.
 In front of Notre-Dame de Calais cathedral is a stele, in memory of the marriage of Yvonne Vendroux and Charles de Gaulle, with the mention taken from the latter's book, Memoirs of Hope For you Yvonne, without whom nothing would have been done.
 In 1963, accordionist René Saget released a song, Le tango de Tante Yvonne, which sold 10,000 copies.
 On 9 November 2013, the anniversary of the death of General de Gaulle, a bronze statue by Élisabeth Cibot representing Charles and Yvonne de Gaulle holding hands is inaugurated in Calais. It is inspired by a photo of the presidential couple, on an official visit to the city in 1959.

Sources

 Bertrand Meyer-Stabley, Les Dames de l'Élysée – Celles d'hier et de demain, Librairie Académique Perrin, Paris.
 Anne-Cécile Beaudoin, « Trianon. Le président reçoit comme un prince », parismatch.com, 22 juin 2016.
 « Elisabeth de Gaulle est morte », in lemonde.fr, 5 avril 2013.
 https://www.letelegramme.fr/ig/generales/fait-du-jour/les-heures-bretonnes-de-de-gaulle-18-06-2010-959624.php
 « Yvonne de Gaulle », sur linternaute.com.
 « Yvonne de Gaulle, la discrète surannée », sur liberation.fr.
 Dominique Jamet, « Il y a cent ans : Félix Faure »(Archive • Wikiwix • Archive.is • Google • Que faire ?) (consulté le 18 mai 2017), Marianne, 2 février 1998, sur Marianne.
 Éric Roussel, Charles de Gaulle, éd. Gallimard, Paris, 2002, 1032 p.  ( et 978-2070752416), p. 851-852.
 Jean-Marie Guénois, « De Gaulle, foi de Général », Le Figaro, encart « Le Figaro et vous », samedi 17 / dimanche 18 juin 2017, page 42.
 Le 24 mars 1959 dans le ciel : Orly accueille le baptême de la Caravelle « Lorraine ».
 « Lancé par le Général de Gaulle », sur linternaute.com.
 Les Présidents de la République Pour les Nuls, First Éditions, 2011 (lire en ligne), p. 205.

Bibliography
 Jean Lacouture, Charles de Gaulle – Le souverain 1959-1970, t. III, éd. du Seuil, 1986 , p. 279-282.
 Max Gallo, De Gaulle, tome IV, La Statue du commandeur, éd. Robert Laffont, Paris, 1998  ; rééd. Pocket, Paris, 2006, p. 29.
 « Une statue de Charles et Yvonne de Gaulle à Calais », Le Figaro, encart « Le Figaro et vous », mardi 22 octobre 2013, page 34.
 Geneviève Moll, Yvonne de Gaulle : l'inattendue, éd. Ramsay, 1999.
 Florence d'Harcourt, Tante Yvonne : une femme d'officier, éd. Éditeur Indépendant, 2007.
 Émilie Aubry et Muriel Pleynet, Pas de deux à l'Élysée, éd. Héloïse d'Ormesson, 2006 (notice BnF no FRBNF40197814).
 Alain Peyrefitte, C'était de Gaulle, éd. Gallimard, 2002.
 Bertrand Meyer-Stabley, Les Dames de l'Élysée : celles d'hier et de demain, Librairie Académique Perrin, Paris.
 Frédérique Neau-Dufour, Yvonne de Gaulle, éd. Fayard, 2010, 590 p.
 Henry Gidel, Les de Gaulle : elle et lui, Flammarion, 2018.
 Gérard Bardy, Les Femmes du Général, Plon, 2018.
 Caroline Pigozzi et Philippe Goulliaud, Les Photos insolites de Charles de Gaulle, éd. Gründ / Plon, 2019.
 Christine Kerdellant, De Gaulle et les femmes, Robert Laffont, 2020.

References

|-

1900 births
1979 deaths
People from Calais
Spouses of French presidents
Spouses of prime ministers of France
Yvonne

Content in this edit is translated from the existing French Wikipedia article at :fr:Yvonne de Gaulle; see its history for attribution.